Lost Continent is a 1951 American black-and-white science fiction film drama from Lippert Pictures, produced by Jack Leewood, Robert L. Lippert, and Sigmund Neufeld, directed by Sam Newfield (Sigmund Neufeld's brother), that stars Cesar Romero, Hillary Brooke, Whit Bissell, Sid Melton, Hugh Beaumont and John Hoyt.

An expedition is sent to the South Pacific to search for a missing atomic-powered rocket in order to retrieve the vital scientific data recorded aboard. On an uncharted island they discover more than their rocket, now crashed atop a mysterious plateau, they find a lost jungle world populated by prehistoric dinosaurs.

Plot
Maj. Joe Nolan (Cesar Romero) is the head of a South Pacific expedition to retrieve an atomic powered rocket that has vanished without a trace. His fellow serviceman and pilot, Lt. Danny Wilson (Chick Chandler), is also an expedition member. Aircraft mechanic Sgt. William Tatlow (Sid Melton) has also been recruited. The expedition includes the three scientists who helped build the rocket.

Their transport aircraft mysteriously crash-lands on a remote, unknown tropical island in the area where the rocket was lost on radar. Only two occupants are left on the island, a native woman (Acquanetta) and her young brother. The woman indicates something fell from the sky atop the forbidding, cloud-shrouded plateau that dominates part of the island. The rocket's fiery arrival caused the rest of the native population to abandon the island.

Expedition member Stanley Briggs (Whit Bissell) dies accidentally on the steep ascent up the escarpment. After long stretches of rock climbing, the expedition emerges from what turns out to be a toxic gas cloud cover. They discover a lush, prehistoric jungle inhabited by various dinosaurs and a large field of uranium, which is what disabled their electronic tracking equipment.

They come upon a Brontosaurus, which attacks Robert Phillips (Hugh Beaumont) as he retreats up a tree. Nolan and Wilson open fire, but they quickly discover that the dinosaur's thick hide absorbs bullets with little effect. Later that night they set up camp. When Nolan awakes, he finds Phillips and Russian scientist Michael Rostov (John Hoyt) gone. Phillips has gotten himself stuck in a large rock crevice near a Triceratops. Nolan accuses Rostov of arranging the accident on purpose, but Rostov insists that he was helping Phillips. The Triceratops nearly attacks the group, but another makes a challenge and the two dinosaurs fight to the death.

Nolan is convinced that Rostov, the scientist who helped make the rocket, is up to no good because he also appeared to be able to save Stanley Briggs on their ascent but failed to do so. Eventually, Rostov reveals himself to be a victim of the Holocaust in which he lost his wife and unborn child.

Wilson later shoots a Pterosaur for food near the rocket's landing site. The group soon discover that the rocket is surrounded by a Brontosaurus and a pair of Triceratops, but Nolan devises a strategy using their weapons that scare off the dinosaurs. Rostov and Phillips retrieve the needed data from the rocket. With his back turned, Tatlow is gored to death by an angry Triceratops, just as it is shot and killed by Nolan and Wilson. After the team finishes digging a grave, violent earthquake tremors begin, and the team must make a hasty retreat down the steep plateau.

The four manage to successfully return to the island's flatland in time to escape the island by using an outrigger canoe. The survivors are finally able to watch from a safe distance as the island is first rocked by more violent earthquakes, followed by a catastrophic eruption of the formerly dormant volcano, which ultimately destroys everything.

Cast
 Cesar Romero as Maj. Joe Nolan
 Hillary Brooke as Marla Stevens
 Chick Chandler as Lt. Danny Wilson
 John Hoyt as Michael Rostov
 Acquanetta as Native girl
 Sid Melton as Sgt. William Tatlow
 Whit Bissell as Stanley Briggs
 Hugh Beaumont as Robert Phillips
 Murray Alper as Air Police Sergeant

Production
Lost Continent was a low-budget film shot in just 11 days from April 13 to late April 1951 at Goldwyn Studios.

Black-and-white footage set atop the prehistoric escarpment was tinted a mint-green color on all theatrical release prints to produce an eerie, other-worldly effect. The general plotline of the film strongly resembles that of Sir Arthur Conan Doyle's novel, The Lost World.

Special effects for the film were credited to Augie Lohman, but recent research, as per an article in Filmfax #105 (March 2005), posits that the stop-motion for the pterodactyl, brontosauruses, and triceratopses, were contracted by Lippert from Edward Nassour, and were likely the actual uncredited work of Jay Baylor and sculptor Henry Lion, who worked for Nassour during that time. Baylor and Lion were also the likely duo who worked on The Beast of Hollow Mountain.

Reception
Lost Continent was not able to overcome its low-budget origins, despite having former screen idol Cesar Romero in a leading role. A later review clearly identified the main issue: " . . . a good third of the movie is spent showing our characters climbing the same styrofoam set prop from different angles . . . The pacing is pretty slow: the first twenty minutes is spent introducing the characters; the next 20 is spent having them climb up a mountain, and then jamming what little action there is into the remaining run time—all of which you would have seen in the trailer".

AllMovie also gave this film a negative review.

MST3K
Lost Continent was featured in a Season 2 episode of Mystery Science Theater 3000 (Dr. Forrester and TV's Frank taunted Joel Robinson before the film began with the words "Rock Climbing.") In a host segment Michael J. Nelson portrayed actor Hugh Beaumont as a member of the Four Horsemen of the Apocalypse.

The Lost Continent episode of MST3K was released by Shout! Factory as part of their Volume XVIII series DVD boxed set.

See also

 Journey to the Beginning of Time (1955)
 1951 in film
 List of science fiction films of the 1950s

References

Notes

Bibliography

 Warren, Bill. Keep Watching The Skies Vol. I: 1950–1957. Jefferson, North Carolina: McFarland & Company, 1982. .

External links 

 
 Original soundtrack for Lost Continent
 Said MST3K episode on ShoutFactoryTV

1951 animated films
1951 films
1950s science fiction films
1950s fantasy films
Films about dinosaurs
Films directed by Sam Newfield
Films set in Oceania
Lippert Pictures films
Lost world films
1950s stop-motion animated films
Films scored by Paul Dunlap
American fantasy adventure films
American science fiction films
American black-and-white films
1950s English-language films
1950s American films